Wólka Piaseczna  is a village in the administrative district of Gmina Goniądz, within Mońki County, Podlaskie Voivodeship, in north-eastern Poland.

Between August and September 1944 the village was pacified by Wehrmacht. As a result, some of the residents were transported to work as forced labor, while 8 residents were murdered. Buildings of the village were demolished or burned, while livestock was robbed.

References

Villages in Mońki County